"You're Gonna Go Far, Kid" is a song by American punk rock band the Offspring. It is the third track from the band's eighth studio album, Rise and Fall, Rage and Grace (2008), and was released as its second single on September 4, 2008.

Background
The song had previously impacted radio on August 12. This is the band's third number one single on the Hot Modern Rock Tracks chart, after "Come Out and Play", and "Hit That". The song stayed at No. 1 for 11 weeks and has sold 1.6 million copies in United States, making it the longest consecutive run for any Offspring single at No. 1. "You're Gonna Go Far, Kid" is certified Platinum by the RIAA. The band has notched 16 top 10s on the Alternative chart since then, including three No. 1s, the most recent being "You're Gonna Go Far, Kid".

Track listing

Music video
The music video for this single was directed by Chris Hopewell, who has also directed videos for several other bands. On October 16, 2008, it was announced on the Offspring's official website that the video would debut Friday, October 17 at 3:00 pm Eastern/12 noon Pacific on Myspace.com.

As in the videos for "Hammerhead" and "Hit That", the video contains large amounts of CGI and does not include any footage of the band performing the song. However, unlike "Hammerhead" and "Hit That", the video also contains live actors recorded by camera mixed in with the CGI effects.

The plot follows a peasant working in a garden in a dystopian future. Suddenly, a nymph appears and gives the peasant a magical, golden acoustic guitar and he begins strumming to the song. He enters town and plays for the locals. The magical abilities of the guitar make the peasant a sensation, earning him much-needed money and causing various townsfolk to start dancing uncontrollably. The peasant then plays for plague infested townspeople and they are cured by the magic of the guitar. In return, he demands from one of them her expensive necklace while the nymph looks upon him disapprovingly. The peasant moves onto a very expensive hotel, but is denied entry based on his appearance. He plays more to earn money for a nice suit. He buys the suit, enters the restaurant and begins to play his guitar for the wealthy socialites, for more money. The nymph appears and punishes the peasant for his selfishness by first forcing him to dance alone to the music, then dragging him into the ground through a whirlpool. The guitar lands onto the floor and dissolves into leaves at the end of the song.

Charts

Certifications

References

External links

2008 singles
The Offspring songs
Songs written by Dexter Holland
Song recordings produced by Bob Rock
2008 songs
Columbia Records singles
Music videos directed by Chris Hopewell